Katharina Sophia Volz (born in Ulm, Germany, 1987) is a medical researcher and entrepreneur. She is the founder and chief executive officer of OccamzRazor, a biotechnology start-up based in New York City and San Francisco, which is searching for cures for incurable diseases. Powered by revolutionary machine learning technology, OccamzRazor harnesses the world's scientific information to discover and develop drugs for brain diseases – much faster and more effectively than ever before.

Early life and education 
Volz was born and raised in Erbach near Ulm, Germany, the birth town of Albert Einstein. After completing secondary school, with average grades, she obtained the Abitur at the grammar school "Valckenburgschule" in Ulm. She began studying molecular biology at the University of Graz, carrying out research in the United States. She has worked at Harvard Medical School, Ohio State University, UCLA, Howard Hughes Medical Institute, and Stanford University. Volz was the first student from Germany's Biotechnology High School to be accepted at Harvard University.

In 2012, Volz became the first-ever Ph.D. in stem cell biology and regenerative medicine at Stanford University. She completed her Ph.D. in a record time of 2.5 years. She was the first person to identify the stem cells that form the coronary arteries. The progenitor stem cell named pericytes turn into smooth muscle cells in response to increased blood flow. Her finding was covered by the Guardian (newspaper) and IFL Science. She worked with Kristy Red-Horse and Irving Weissman.

Research and career 
Volz is one of UNESCO's trusted speakers and was a United Nations WED fellow in 2015. Volz made it on the global Forbes 30 Under 30 list in 2017. Volz was a participant at the 2017, 2018, 2019 Science Foo Camp. She got accepted into the first cohort of the United Nations Nexus Accelerator program in 2020. She was named in MIT technology review's top 35 under 35 innovators. Previous winners include Larry Page and Sergey Brin, Mark Zuckerberg, the cofounder of Facebook; Jonathan Ive, the chief designer of Apple; Helen Greiner, Max Levchin, the cofounder of PayPal and founder of Slide; and MIT neuroscientist Ed Boyden one of the inventors of the emerging field of optogenetics, which makes it possible to control gene expression by light.

OccamzRazor 
Volz is the founder and Chief Executive Officer of OccamzRazor, a biotechnology startup using machine learning to identify cures for brain-aging diseases such as Parkinson's. In partnership with the Stanford AI lab, OccamzRazor built machine learning algorithms that can read, extract and process information from a variety of structured (Genomics, Proteomics, Transcriptomics etc.) and unstructured (publications, patents, clinical trial documents) data. They are mapping all existing scientific knowledge about brain-aging disorders such as Parkinson's disease and, using predictive algorithms, are now pinpointing what goes wrong inside cells that eventually lead to this disease. OccamzRazor's technology is able to connect information to better predict the chance of a specific drug target's success. For example, they can identify which protein to target so that they can repair multiple cellular dysfunctions at the same time. They are validating their computational predictions in the laboratory with their partners and are in the process of starting clinical programs in partnership with pharmaceutical companies. To showcase their technology, they have also applied these algorithms to uncover the latent structure of other domains and published their results at the Graph Representation Learning Workshop at NeurIPS.

OccamzRazor is partnering with or has received grant funding from institutions in Parkinson's and Machine Learning such as the Michael J Fox Foundation, the Sergey Brin Family Foundation, and Stanford. OccamzRazor is further supported by investors Jeff Dean, Lead of Google AI, and Nobel Laureate Randy Schekman.

References 

Parkinson's disease researchers
Harvard Medical School alumni
Stanford University alumni
University of Graz alumni
Health research
Living people
People from Ulm
1987 births